Jamil Rahmat Vance is a retired Major general of the Pakistan Army.

Early life
He was born in the small village of Mara Khai, located about a kilometer from the town of Islamgarh in Mirpur and Azad Kashmir, Pakistan.

He was inspired by his uncle, a retired Colonel from the Pakistan Army, to join as a commissioning officer.

Military career
He was promoted to Major General on 10 August 2011.

References

Living people
Pakistani generals
People from Mirpur District
Year of birth missing (living people)